Danny Kiranos (born June 26, 1987), better known as his stage name Amigo the Devil, is an American singer-songwriter, guitarist, and banjo player. His music is influenced by American folk, country, rock, and heavy metal, with themes of murder, death, and other dark subject matters which has led to his music being called "Dark Folk" or "Murderfolk". Kiranos created the record label Liars Club Records with the label Regime Music Group.

Biography 
Kiranos was born and raised in Miami, Florida. He is the son of a Greek father and a Spanish mother, and was influenced by the traditional music of both cultures. He started playing the guitar when he was around fourteen and then joined a band with friends of his at sixteen. In this group he started touring around Florida. Once he was seventeen, he started moving around the country. He first went to California to attend the Los Angeles Film School to make horror films but quickly dropped out and enrolled in a local culinary school.  He eventually settled down and worked in the brewing industry. While in San Francisco, California, Kiranos started going by his stage name Amigo the Devil. He started gaining popularity for his energetic live performances and built-up a fanbase.

In 2019, Mayor Steve Adler of the city of Austin, Texas announced November 16th as "Amigo the Devil Day" in the city and awarded a signed seal to Kiranos.

Music festival appearances 

 Aftershock 2018
 Sonic Temple Art & Music Festival 2019
 Welcome to Rockville 2019
 Louder Than Life 2019
 Welcome to Rockville 2021
 Riot Fest 2021
 Lunasea Beach Festival 2022
 Louder Than Life 2022

Discography

Albums

EPs

References

External links

1987 births
Living people
21st-century American singers
American male singer-songwriters
American rock songwriters
Singer-songwriters from Florida
American people of Greek descent
American people of Spanish descent
Musicians from Miami